Bekapai Park is a park situated in the city of Balikpapan, East Kalimantan. The park is located in the middle of the city, close to nearby shopping centers. There is a fountain made of stainless steel and a bronze sculpture in the middle of the park.

References

Balikpapan
Parks in Indonesia
Tourist attractions in East Kalimantan